Marrick is a village and civil parish in the Richmondshire district of North Yorkshire, England, situated in lower Swaledale in the Yorkshire Dales National Park, the village is approximately  west of Richmond. The parish of Marrick also includes the hamlets of Hurst and Washfold, according to the UK 2011 Census, the population of the parish was 148.

History 

Marrick Priory, a former Benedictine nunnery dating back to the 12th century was the site of the local place of worship, the Church of the Virgin Mary and St. Andrew until its conversion into a farm building in 1948, and later an outdoor education and residential centre for young people.

The hamlet of Hurst,  to the north was a mining centre in the 19th century.

Marrickville in Sydney, Australia is named after Marrick, North Yorkshire.

Governance 
The village lies within the Richmond (Yorks) parliamentary constituency, which is under the control of the Conservative Party. The current Member of Parliament, since the 2015 general election, is Rishi Sunak. Marrick is part of the Richmondshire District Council electoral ward of Lower Swaledale and Arkengarthdale.

Notable people 

 Birthplace of racehorse breeder William Blenkiron.

References

External links

Villages in North Yorkshire
Civil parishes in North Yorkshire
Swaledale